David Riebel (August 7, 1855 – July 29, 1935) was a German-American architect in Columbus, Ohio. He was the head architect for the Columbus public school district from 1893 to 1922. In 1915, The Ohio Architect, Engineer and Builder considered his firm, David Riebel & Sons, to be the oldest and among the best architects in Columbus.

Early life and career

David Riebel was born on August 7, 1855 in Blenheim, Ontario. He was married in Bosanquet Township on November 3, 1875. At the time, he was described as a carpenter. With his wife, Margaret Ann Clemens, by 1895 he had four children: Laura, Elroy, Frederick, and Mary Edna.

Riebel began practicing architecture around 1878. His first major commissions were in Forest, Ontario: its town hall (built 1883-84, demolished in 1982) and the Second Empire-style mansion of Dr. James Hutton (built in 1887 and demolished in 1935).

Riebel moved with his family to Columbus, Ohio in February 1888 to open up a new architectural office. He became the first head of the architectural department of the Columbus Board of Education (the lead architect for Columbus City Schools) in 1893. In that position, Riebel designed about 40 Columbus public school buildings between 1891 and 1921; the remaining buildings are some of Columbus's most notable landmarks. His two sons joined him in designing buildings in 1904, after thorough training, giving the firm the name "David Riebel & Sons". Riebel continued in the position until 1922.

For a time, Riebel had his offices in the William J. Lhota Building, originally known as the New First National Bank Building.

David Riebel died on July 29, 1935. He is buried at Green Lawn Cemetery.

Works

In Columbus
Riebel was involved in the design of numerous Columbus buildings:

Outside Columbus
Works in other areas included:
 Public school (Worthington, Ohio, 1896)
 Town Hall (Forest, Ontario, 1883-4)
 Dr. James Hutton mansion (Forest, Ontario, 1887)
 St. Mary's School (Lancaster, Ohio, 1910)
 First Church of Christ Scientist (Lancaster, Ohio, 1921)
 Public school (Crooksville, Ohio, 1923)

See also
 Architecture of Columbus, Ohio

References

External links
 

Architects from Columbus, Ohio
1855 births
1935 deaths
People from Lambton County
Burials at Green Lawn Cemetery (Columbus, Ohio)